Donatian may refer to:

Donatian of Carthage (died 259), one of the Martyrs of Carthage under Valerian
Donatian and Rogatian of Nantes
 Basilica of St. Donatian and St. Rogatian, Nantes
Donatian of Reims (died 389), 4th-century French saint, the 8th Bishop of Reims

See also
Donatien, a given name
Donation (disambiguation)
Naessens, a Dutch form of Donatian